Clague Garden Estate is a Flat-for-Sale Scheme public housing estate in Tsuen Wan, New Territories, Hong Kong located on reclaimed land near Tsuen Wan Pier and MTR Tsuen Wan West station. It now consists of three residential buildings, built in 1989 by Hong Kong Housing Society. It offers 552 flats for rent and 926 under the Flat-for-Sale Scheme. Many early residents were resettled from the Four Seasons Estate, a nearby public housing estate that was demolished in 1990.

Background
The estate was named for Sir Douglas Clague, the ex-chairman of Hong Kong Housing Society and the former head of Hutchison International. It received a Certificate of Merit at the 1991 Hong Kong Institute of Architects Annual Awards.

Politics
Clague Garden Estate is located in Clague Garden constituency of the Tsuen Wan District Council. It was formerly represented by Chan Kim-kam, who was elected in the 2019 elections until July 2021.

See also

Public housing estates in Tsuen Wan

References

Tsuen Wan
Public housing estates in Hong Kong
Flat-for-Sale Scheme
Housing estates with centralized LPG system in Hong Kong